

List of Nigerian DJs
 DJ Abass
 DJ Bally
 DJ Big N
 DJ Caise
 DJ Cuppy
 DJ Enimoney
 DJ KayWise
 DJ Exclusive
 DJ Jimmy Jatt
 DJ Neptune
 DJ Spinall

References

Lists of Nigerian people
Nigerian DJs